Hearts Unbroken is a young adult romance novel written by Cynthia Leitich Smith, published October 9, 2018 by Candlewick Press.

The book received the American Indian Youth Literature Award for Young Adult Book in 2020.

Hearts Unbroken is set in the same universe as Leitich Smith's Rain Is Not My Indian Name; the protagonists are cousins.

Reception 
Hearts Unbroken received a starred review from School Library Journal, positive reviews from the Bulletin of the Center for Children's Books, The Horn Book, and Booklist, as well as mediocre reviews from Publishers Weekly, and Kirkus.

The book also received the following accolades:

 Neustadt Lit Fest Booklist (2021)
 All Iowa Reads! Books for Teens shortlist (2021)
 American Indian Youth Literature Award for Young Adult Book winner (2020)
 Teaching for Change: Social Justice Books Selection (2020)
 Spotlight on Diversity Title, New England Book Show (2020)
 The Amelia Bloomer Book List selection (2019)
 Outstanding Books for the College Bound: Literature and Language Arts selection (2019)
 Bank Street Best Books List (2019)
 Foreword Reviews SILVER Winner for Young Adult Fiction (2018)
 Read In Color Recommended Reading List (2021)

Reflection 

2018 children's books
Young adult romance novels
American romance novels
Native American novels